This is a list of colleges and universities in the U.S. state of Missouri. For the purposes of this list, colleges and universities are defined as accredited, degree-granting, post secondary institutions. There are currently 67 such institutions operating in the state, including thirteen public universities, thirty-nine private 4-year institutions, and thirteen community colleges. In addition, many out-of-state institutions offer courses and degrees at locations in Missouri. Classifications are as defined by the Carnegie Classification of Institutions of Higher Education.

University of Missouri System

The University of Missouri System is a state university system providing centralized administration for four universities, a health care system, an extension program, five research and technology parks, and a University of Missouri Press. More than 64,000 students are currently enrolled at its four campuses. Headquartered in Columbia on the original campus, the extension program provides distance learning and other educational initiatives statewide.  The UM System was created in 1963 when the University of Missouri and its offshoot, the Missouri School of Mines and Metallurgy, were combined with the formerly-private University of Kansas City and a newly created campus in suburban St. Louis.

Public universities

* Harris Teachers College was the City of St. Louis' teachers college for white students, and Stowe Teachers College was for black students until 1954, when the school board merged the two.

Private colleges and universities

Associate's (community) colleges

Public
 Crowder College
 East Central College
 Jefferson College
 Metropolitan Community College
 Mineral Area College
 Missouri State University–West Plains
 Moberly Area Community College
 North Central Missouri College
 Ozarks Technical Community College
 St. Charles Community College
 St. Louis Community College
 State Fair Community College
 State Technical College of Missouri
 Three Rivers Community College

Private
Ranken Technical College

Theological seminaries
Assemblies of God Theological Seminary
Baptist Bible College
Central Christian College of the Bible
Concordia Seminary
Covenant Theological Seminary
Eden Theological Seminary
Kenrick-Glennon Seminary
Midwestern Baptist Theological Seminary
Midwest University
Nazarene Theological Seminary
Ozark Christian College
Saint Louis Christian College
Saint Paul School of Theology
Urshan Graduate School of Theology

Special focus
A. T. Still University
Cox College
Kansas City Art Institute
Kansas City University of Medicine and Biosciences
Logan University
University of Health Sciences and Pharmacy in St. Louis

Defunct institutions 
 Wentworth Military Academy and College (1880-2017), Lexington
 Marion College, one of Missouri's oldest colleges, closed in 1844
 Central Bible College (1922-2013)

See also

 List of college athletic programs in Missouri
 Higher education in the United States
 List of American institutions of higher education
 List of recognized higher education accreditation organizations

Notes

External links
Missouri public and independent colleges - Missouri Dept. of Higher Education
Department of Education listing of accredited institutions in Missouri

Missouri
Universities And Colleges